The Louisville Leader was a weekly newspaper published in Louisville, Kentucky, from 1917 to 1950.

History 
The Louisville Leader was a weekly African American newspaper founded by I. Willis Cole in November 1917.  By the 1930s, Cole employed twenty people and had a circulation reaching 20,000.

Cole died in February 1950 and his wife tried to continue to publish the newspaper until it eventually stopped that September.

In 1954, the Louisville Defender had called the Leader "one of the largest Negro newspaper organizations" in Louisville. View Jefferson County Sunday School Association for examples of how important this newspaper was in connecting various organizations and keeping everyone aware of local civil rights activities.

See also 
History of Louisville, Kentucky

References

External links 
 Louisville Leader Collection from the University of Louisville Archives & Records Center

Defunct newspapers published in Louisville, Kentucky
Defunct weekly newspapers
Publications established in 1917
Publications disestablished in 1950
Defunct African-American newspapers
1917 establishments in Kentucky
1950 disestablishments in Kentucky